Alfie may refer to:

Theatre and film
 Alfie (play), a 1963 play by Bill Naughton
 Alfie (1966 film), a film based on the play starring Michael Caine
 Alfie (2004 film), a remake of the 1966 film
 Alfie (2013 film), an Indian short film

Music 
 The Alfee, Japanese rock band formerly named Alfie
 Alfie (band), English indie rock band
 Alfie (Sonny Rollins album), album based on the music for the 1966 film
 Alfie (Alfie Boe album), the sixth studio album by Alfie Boe
 Alfie (2004 film soundtrack), the soundtrack to the 2004 film remake
 "Alfie" (Burt Bacharach song), a 1966 Burt Bacharach and Hal David song
 "Alfie" (Lily Allen song), a 2007 song

People
 Alfie (name), a given name, nickname, and surname

See also 
 ALF (disambiguation)
 Alfi (disambiguation)
 Alf (disambiguation)